Bublikovo is a rural locality (a selo) in Alexeyevsky District, Belgorod Oblast, Russia. The population was 266 as of 2010. There are 3 streets.

Geography 
Bublikovo is located 30 km south of Alexeyevka (the district's administrative centre) by road. Zhukovo is the nearest rural locality.

References 

Rural localities in Alexeyevsky District, Belgorod Oblast
Biryuchensky Uyezd